Ter Leyen Castle is a castle in  Boekhoute Belgium.

See also
List of castles in Belgium

Castles in Belgium
Castles in East Flanders
Assenede